John Marshall Clemens (August 11, 1798 – March 24, 1847) was the father of author Mark Twain.

Biography
Clemens was the scion of a Virginia family that owned both land and slaves in that state. The Clemens were said to be a Cornish American family originally from Looe in Cornwall, England, however the Looe museum provides evidence showing that they instead emigrated from Corby. He was born in Campbell County, Virginia, the eldest of five children, to Samuel B. and Pamela Goggin Clemens. He was named after U.S. Chief Justice John Marshall.

His father died in 1805, whereupon the family moved to Kentucky. Pamela Clemens remarried in 1809, and John Clemens started working at age 11, as a clerk at an iron mine. He undertook the study of law in a local law office and became a licensed lawyer at the age of 21. At that same age, he became legally responsible for financial obligations deemed to be owed to his Kentucky stepfather for the costs of supporting the Clemens children and keeping family slaves. The burden of this debt left him without financial resources.

He married Jane Lampton on May 6, 1823, in Columbia, Adair County, Kentucky. She was a religiously conservative Presbyterian, while he was an agnostic freethinker who admired Tom Paine. They moved to Fentress County, Tennessee, where he practiced law, operated a general store, and served as a county commissioner, county clerk, and acting attorney general as a conservative Whig. From 1832 to 1835 he was postmaster in Pall Mall. He speculated unsuccessfully in land and opened four stores which were unsuccessful.

In 1835 the Clemens family, which by then included five children, moved to Missouri, initially to the town of Florida, where his son Samuel, who was to become famous as the author Mark Twain, was born on November 30, 1835. John Clemens practiced law and operated a general store in Florida for several years before moving to Hannibal in 1839. His retail business ventures were not successful, but he was active in civic affairs. He served as a steamboat and railroad commissioner and became a county judge. He served in the Missouri militia but did not serve in the debacle of the Honey War.

John Clemens was the father of five sons (including Orion) and two daughters. He died in March 1847 from pleurisy and pneumonia. His widow suspected syphilis was involved and ordered an autopsy which the young Samuel Clemens may have witnessed.

Cabin
The cabin in which the Clemens family is believed to have lived in Fentress County, Tennessee, is displayed as part of the collection of the Museum of Appalachia in Norris, Tennessee.

References

1798 births
1847 deaths
County commissioners in Tennessee
Missouri lawyers
American people of Cornish descent
John Marshall
People from Campbell County, Virginia
County officials in Missouri
County officials in Tennessee
Tennessee lawyers
19th-century American politicians
People from Columbia, Kentucky
People from Fentress County, Tennessee
People from Pall Mall, Tennessee
19th-century American lawyers
Deaths from pneumonia
Deaths from pleurisy